Treacle is any uncrystallised syrup made during the refining of sugar. The most common forms of treacle are golden syrup, a pale variety, and a darker variety known as black treacle, similar to molasses. Black treacle has a distinctively strong, slightly bitter flavour, and a richer colour than golden syrup. Golden syrup treacle is a common sweetener and condiment in British cuisine, found in such dishes as treacle tart and treacle sponge pudding.

Etymology
Historically, the Middle English term  was used by herbalists and apothecaries to describe a medicine (also called theriac or theriaca), composed of many ingredients, that was used as an antidote for poisons, snakebites, and various other ailments.

Production
Treacle is made from the syrup that remains after sugar is refined. Raw sugars are first treated in a process called affination. When dissolved, the resulting liquor contains the minimum of dissolved non-sugars to be removed by treatment with activated carbon or bone char. The dark-coloured washings are treated separately, without carbon or bone char. They are boiled to grain (i.e. until sugar crystals precipitate out) in a vacuum pan, forming a low-grade  (boiled mass) which is centrifuged, yielding a brown sugar and a liquid by-product—treacle. Black treacle naturally contains relatively high levels of sulphite (>100ppm, expressed in sulphur dioxide equivalent). These levels are deemed safe for the majority of the population, but some allergic and respiratory reactions have been reported particularly amongst asthmatics, so that the United States Food and Drug Administration requires that levels over 10ppm, i.e. >10mg/kg, be declared on the ingredients label.

In culture

A traditional Cornish fisherman's celebratory drink is "Mahogany", made from two parts local gin—now usually Plymouth Gin—mixed with one part black treacle.
	
In chapter 7 of Lewis Carroll's Alice's Adventures in Wonderland, the Dormouse tells the story of Elsie, Lacie, and Tillie, who live at the bottom of a well. This confuses Alice, who interrupts to ask what they ate for sustenance. "The Dormouse again took a minute or two to think about it, and then said, 'It was a treacle-well.'" This is an allusion to the so-called "treacle well", the curative St Margaret's Well at Binsey, Oxfordshire.

In chapter 10 of Thomas Hardy's Tess of the d'Urbervilles: A Pure Woman Faithfully Presented, Car the Queen of Spades carries a glass bottle of treacle in a basket above her head. The bottle breaks and the syrup pours down her backside. Tess laughs with the others present but Car is angry at her.

See also

 Caramelisation
 List of syrups
 Treacle mining
 Treacle protein
 Treacle sponge pudding
 Venice treacle, also known as Treacle of Andromachus: see

References

Citations

Bibliography

External links

Old 'Recipes4us' page "Treacle Origin"
CSR Sugar company of Australia – Treacle
Sugar Australia website – refiner and marketer for CSR limited.

Sugars
Syrup